Marian Awad (born 29 October 1996) is an Arab-Israeli footballer who plays as a midfielder for Spanish club Villarreal CF and the Israel women's national team.

Early life
Awad was born in Haifa, Israel, and to an Arab-Israeli family.

International career
Awad has been capped for the Israel national team, appearing for the senior squad during the 2019 FIFA Women's World Cup qualifiers.

International goals

References

External links
 
 
 

1996 births
Living people
Footballers from Haifa
Israeli women's footballers
Women's association football midfielders
Villarreal CF (women) players
Israel women's international footballers
Israeli expatriate women's footballers
Israeli expatriate sportspeople in Spain
Expatriate women's footballers in Spain
Arab-Israeli footballers
Arab citizens of Israel